The Peruvian Ambassador to Israel is the Ambassador of the Peruvian government to the government of Israel.

Peru has an embassy in Tel Aviv and Israel has an embassy in Lima. While Palestine also has an embassy in Lima, Peru does not have a representation in Ramallah or any other city in the country, although former president Pedro Castillo announced the intention of the country to open an Embassy in 2022.

List of representatives

References

Israel
 
Peru